CFA may refer to:

 CFA franc, a currency used by fourteen African countries
 Chartered Financial Analyst, an international investment professional designation
 Chick-fil-A, US fast food chain

Agreements
 Canadian Football Act
 Ceasefire agreement
 Compact of Free Association, agreement between US, Micronesia, Marshall Islands, and Palau
 Conditional fee agreement, a legal agreement also known as "no win no fee"

Medicine
 Common femoral artery
 Complete Freund's adjuvant, an immunopotentiator composed of inactivated and dried mycobacteria
 Cryptogenic fibrosing alveolitis, an archaic term for idiopathic pulmonary fibrosis

Organizations
 California Faculty Association, the union representing employees at California State University system
 Call For Action, telephone help-lines of radio stations in the United States
 Campaign for Accountability, a non-profit organization in the United States
 Consumer Federation of America, consumer group
 Consumers' Federation of Australia, consumer advocacy group
 Campus Freethought Alliance, former name for Center for Inquiry On Campus, a skeptics' group
 CFA Institute, formerly known as the Association for Investment Management and Research (AIMR)
 Canadian Forestry Association
 Canadian Fraternal Association
 Carinthian Farmers' Association, a political party in Austria
 Carnegie Mellon College of Fine Arts, a college of Carnegie Mellon University
 Cat Fanciers' Association, the world's largest registry of pedigreed cats
 Catfish Farmers of America; see Catfish Dispute
 Center for Astrophysics  Harvard & Smithsonian, an American astronomy research and education institution
 Country Fire Authority, a volunteer fire service in Victoria, Australia

Sports
 Championnat de France Amateur, a French football competition
 Championnat de France Amateur (1935–1971), a French former football competition
 College Football Association, a defunct group through which colleges negotiated American football TV contracts with networks
 County football association, governing bodies for local football in England
 Cyprus Football Association, the governing body of football in Cyprus
 Chinese Football Association, the governing body of football in China
 City Football Academy, part of Etihad Campus that is the training base for Manchester footballers in England

Science and technology
 Color filter array, a mosaic of tiny color filters placed over an image sensor to capture color information
 CompactFlash Association, a mass storage device format used in portable electronic devices
 Confirmatory factor analysis, statistical method used to explain variability among observed random variables
 Continuous flight augering, a drilling method for concrete pilings
 Continuous flow analysis, an automated analyzer using a special flow technique
 Control flow analysis, in computer science
 Crossed field antenna, a type of antenna for long and mediumwave broadcasting
 Crossed-field amplifier, a specialized vacuum tube used as a microwave amplifier
 Current-feedback operational amplifier, a type of operational amplifier
 Component failure analysis, to determine the cause of a failure
 .cfa, the file extension for an Adobe Premiere Pro computer audio file
 Cfa, one of two symbols for the humid subtropical climate under the Köppen climate classification
 CfA, the Center for Astrophysics | Harvard & Smithsonian

Transport
 Compagnie Française d'Aviation, a defunct French aircraft manufacturer
 National Company for Rail Transport or Chemins de fer Algériens, the former national railway of Algeria
 Chemins de Fer Armoricains, a former railway in Brittany, France
 ICAO airline code for China Flying Dragon Aviation

Arts and entertainment
 Canadian Film Awards
 United States Commission of Fine Arts, an advisory agency of the United States Government

Other uses
 Call for abstracts, a method used in academic contexts to encourage researchers to submit abstracts for conferences
 Cape Field Artillery, an artillery regiment of the South African Army
 Court of Final Appeal (Hong Kong), the highest court of Hong Kong